The Philippines women's national Futsal team represents the Philippines in international futsal competitions and is controlled by the Philippine Futsal Committee of the Philippine Football Federation.

History

A women's futsal team was formed around the mid-2000s when Emmanuel Batungbacal first came into the contact with Philippine Football Federation. At that time  Johnny Romualdez was the federation president and former Ateneo player Domeka Garamenda was the secretary general. Batungbacal was given the greenlight to form a team but he had to rely on his funding. The team joined the 2005 Asian Indoor Games where they finished fourth place. They later joined the 2007 Southeast Asian Games where they overcame Malaysia in the bronze medal game.

In 2007, José Mari Martínez would succeed Romualdez as PFF president. In 2009, the federation was riddled with controversy. The PFF Futsal Committee head Esmaeil Sedigh recommended Batungbacal's removal as head coach in early 2009, which prompted the resignation of the women's futsal team's players. Batungbacal was allegedly removed for sending an unsanctioned women's futsal squad to the Vikings Futsal Cup in New Zealand although the coach presented a PFF document contradicting this claim. Martinez cites the coach's lack of coaching credentials for the move.Esmaeil Sedigh would take over as women's futsal coach.

Dutch former player and coach Victor Hermans was brought in by the PFF in 2020 to serve as a technical consultant for futsal. 

The PFF under Hermans' advice revived the women's team and formed the core of the new team from players hailing from the Tuloy sa Don Bosco Foundation. The squad would train despite the COVID-19 pandemic. In 2022, the new women's futsal team was unveiled adopting the moniker "Pinays". The team took part at the Pinay5 Futsal Faceoff, a two-game friendly series with Guam. They lost the first game 0–1, but won the second one 3–1.

Fixtures and results
Legend

Tournament record

Asian Indoor and Martial Arts Games

Southeast Asian Games

Vikings Futsal Cup New Zealand
 2008 Christchurch - Fourth Place 
The women's national team competed under the name IROK Philippines at the Vikings Futsal Cup. After the national team under coach Emmanuel Batungbacal was sacked by the Philippine Football Federation after the team competed at the tournament allegedly without the sanction of the federation. The former national team renamed itself as IROK Philippines Futsal Club in 2009 planning to compete in the 2009 edition of the Vikings Futsal Cup.

Coaches
  Emmanuel Batungbacal (2005–2009)
  Esmaeil Sedigh (2009–?)
  Paul Encarnacion (?)
  Victor Hermans (2022–)

References

Futsal
W
Asian women's national futsal teams
Women's national sports teams of the Philippines
Women's football in the Philippines